Segula Volcano lies  westward of Anchorage on the Segula Island in the Aleutian Islands of Alaska. An inactive stratovolcano, it has not produced any historical eruptions, while barely eroded deposits on the flanks suggest that activity took place at the volcano as late as a couple of hundred years ago.

Built on top of a shallow platform, the volcano grew steadily from eruptions, and is composed of strata of flow deposits and pyroclastic material.

Geography and geology 
Part of the Rat Islands, Segula Volcano is located, along with the other Aleutians, in the Pacific Ocean. It is located in a row of islands which stretch from Kiska Island to as far east as the Andreanof Islands.

Segula Island and the volcano formed over an underwater land surface which hosts other Aleutian volcanoes such as Khvostof and Davidof. Andesitic lava and pyroclastic material was ejected from the underwater crater, building up over time to break the surface from nearly  underwater.

Segula is made up of overlapping strata of lava flows and pyroclastic deposits, built up from the caldera. Largely built of eruptive material, the stratovolcano is conical and marked by a fissure. Since it is surrounded by lava flows on the north flank and a cinder cone on the other, the mountain's caldera, or main crater, appears tiny and is therefore very difficult to make out from any photographs. The north side of the island is summarized by sharp cliffs and a shallow reef which together make accessibility from that side difficult. It has not had a recorded eruption, though numerous deposits of lava flows and other ejecta on the southern and eastern flanks and a submarine deposit to the north of the summit which extends for  have very little erosion, making it likely that Segula has erupted in the last few hundred years.

References 

Volcanoes of the Aleutian Islands
Landforms of Aleutians West Census Area, Alaska
Stratovolcanoes of the United States
Volcanoes of Alaska
Volcanoes of Unorganized Borough, Alaska
Cinder cones of the United States